Just Jim is a 1915 American drama film featuring Harry Carey and released by Universal Pictures.

Cast
 Harry Carey as Jim (as Harry D. Carey)
 Jean Taylor as Rose
 William A. Crinley as Undetermined Role (as William Crinley)
 Albert Edmondson as Undetermined Role (as Mr. Edmundson)
 Duke Worne as Undetermined Role
 Olive Carey as Undetermined Role (as Olive Golden)
 Jack Abbott (as J.F. Abbott)
 Harry Lorraine (as Mr. Lorraine)

See also
 Harry Carey filmography

References

External links

1915 films
1915 drama films
Silent American drama films
American silent feature films
American black-and-white films
Universal Pictures films
Films directed by Oscar A. C. Lund
1910s American films